Ljubiša "Mauzer" Savić (11 August 1958 – 7 June 2000) was a Bosnian Serb paramilitary commander during the Bosnian War and a post-war politician. He led the Garda Panteri during the war.

After the war, he became the chief of police in Bijeljina. He was killed in Bijeljina in 2000, due to suspected gang violence in the city after three gunmen reportedly fired upon his jeep. The first attempt on Savić's life happened in July 1998. Two former Republika Srpska soldiers, Stojan Maksimović and Vladimir Neretljak, were killed in an explosion outside his house. Savić accused Momčilo Krajišnik, the then leader of the SDS, and pro-Belgrade elements in the entity's security services of attempting to plant a bomb under his car. He had been involved in anti-corruption campaigns, and had arrested many corrupt people, even supporters of Radovan Karadžić, including Joja Tintor. The Garda Panteri had also been known to have busted smugglers during the Bosnian War that were controlled by both the SDS, as well as the Republika Srpska government.

Life 
Before the Bosnian War, Ljubiša Savić worked in Bijeljina as a social worker.

In the Bosnian war between 1992 and 1995, Savić commanded the Garda Panteri, which was later incorporated as a special unit in the armed forces of the Republika Srpska. In contrast to other paramilitary Serb units such as the Serb Volunteer Guard under Željko "Arkan" Ražnatović, Savić and his unit were not involved in  terrorizing of citizens within his home town of Bijeljina. After the liberation of Bijeljina, it came to the massacre of Bijeljina, in which 48 to 78 civilians were killed. Savić's unit also broke through the sieges of several smaller towns during the war.

Savić was the commander of the Batković prison camp at Bijeljina, which was established in June 1992 on a farm where around 1,200–1,700 non-Serb prisoners of war and one-third of civilians were also allegedly detained "for their own protection". In the camp, the prisoners were housed in poor conditions, and there was mistreatment of military and civilian prisoners by Serb soldiers, even with fatalities.

After the war, Savić became police chief in Bijeljina. As he fought against corruption in Republika Srpska as well as had some high-ranking government officials, including Radovan Karadžić sympathizers arrested, his number of enemies grew steadily. Joja Tintor, Karadžić's former adviser, was arrested by Savić in the spring of 1998, but was ordered by his superiors to release Tintor despite the burden of proof. He responded to this request, but continued his efforts against corruption.

Savić was since the victim of a repeated number of attacks. In July 1998, he narrowly escaped death by a bomb placed under his car. In this assassination, however, two of his former comrades died. After the attempted capture of Milovan Bjelica, a close friend of Savić, was shot dead outside his home in Pale. Savić was also a member of the special police unit founded after the attack. Shortly after the assassination, he arrested seven suspects, including Karadžić sympathizers once again. However, following torture allegations, he was subsequently prohibited from doing any further police work, and released the suspects. As a result, Savić went further into isolation and was only able to protect his former comrades of the Garda Panteri.

Death 
Savić was shot dead in his vehicle near a railway station on 7 June 2000, when he stopped briefly to escort an elderly woman home. According to eyewitness reports, another vehicle suddenly appeared, from which Ždrale, already convicted of murder and unofficially released, opened fire with an automatic firearm. Savić was hit by six of the thirteen bullets fired and was killed instantly. It is believed that he fell victim to organized gang crime.

His death was preceded by several months of constant observation and analysis of his way of life by Ždrale, who, together with two unknown persons, prepared the assassination. He acquired weapons, ammunition, a vehicle, clothing and radios. It was not until 2010 that he was convicted, since his clearance was not registered in the files and he therefore had an alibi.

Savić was buried in his home village Kovačići near Bijeljina in the circle of his family, friends and former comrades.

Politics 
Ljubiša Savić was one of the founding members of Srpska Demokratska Stranka (SDS) in Bijeljina. In 1996 he left the SDS, whose leader was Radovan Karadžić for a long time. He then founded his own party called Demokratska Stranka (RS); this participated in the party alliance consisting of five parties, Demokratski Patriotski Blok (DPB), which succeeded in the election on 14 September 1996 with two deputies (including Savić himself), gaining entrance into the Parliament of the Republika Srpska. In the summer of 1997, he also supported the anti-corruption campaign of the then President of Republika Srpska, Biljana Plavšić, who also resigned from the SDS.

References 

1958 births
2000 deaths
People from Bijeljina
Serbs of Bosnia and Herzegovina
Chiefs of police
Assassinated military personnel
Assassinated Serbian people
Deaths by firearm in Bosnia and Herzegovina
Army of Republika Srpska soldiers
People murdered in Bosnia and Herzegovina
2000 crimes in Bosnia and Herzegovina
2000 murders in Europe
2000s murders in Bosnia and Herzegovina